The Ndyuka people (also spelled 'Djuka') or Aukan people (Okanisi), are one of six Maroon peoples (formerly called "Bush Negroes", which also has pejorative tinges) in the Republic of Suriname and one of the Maroon peoples in French Guiana. The Aukan or Ndyuka speak the Ndyuka language. They are subdivided into the Opu, who live upstream of the Tapanahony River in the Tapanahony resort of southeastern Suriname, and the Bilo, who live downstream of that river in Marowijne District

They further subdivide themselves into twelve matrilinear kinship groups called . 

History
The Ndyuka and related people are of African descent, enslaved and transported as cargo by the Dutch to Suriname in the 17–18th century to work on Dutch-owned colonial plantations. Those who escaped fled deep into the rainforests where they established Maroon communities along rivers in mostly southeastern Suriname and parts of neighboring French Guiana and where their culture adopted elements of Native American cultures. It is rare for Ndyuka people to marry outside the group, "so they remain genetically close to their African ancestors."

In 1757, a large slave revolt took place at six wood plantations near the Tempati Creek. The runaway slaves joined an existing group of Maroons. The Society of Suriname was concerned about the size and strength of the group, therefore Captain Zobre was dispatched on 30 July 1759 to negotiate. Zobre returned with a temporary ceasefire agreement, and information that the tribe consisted of six villages with an estimated population of 2,000 people. The second expedition was less successful: the Ndyuka were disappointed in gifts like mirrors and said that they preferred guns and ammunition. They also wanted the presence of the plantation owners of the Jodensavanne at the negotiations.

On 10 October 1760, the Ndyuka signed a treaty with the Dutch colonizers, recognizing territorial autonomy. Day of the Maroons has been observed as a national holiday in Suriname on 10 October since 2010.

Autonomous people
From 1761, many Ndyuka gradually moved southwards from Marowijne District in order to protect themselves from the colonists, and started to build camps on the Tapanahoni River dispelling the indigenous Tiriyó. Slaves who had recently fled from Armina and Boven Commewijne were stationed near the confluence of the Tapanahoni and Lawa River to guard against attacks by the Aluku. In December 1791, Philip Stoelman founded a military outpost on Stoelmanseiland, thus establishing a militarised border between the Ndyuka held territory and the Colony of Suriname. Tapanahony was off-limits to white settlers, and was not explored until the beginning of the 20th century.

Trade
Even though Tapanahony was isolated and generally neglected by the government, it was not  completely self-sufficient. Trade was encouraged by both sides; article 7 of the Treaty can be regarded as a free-trade agreement. Between 1880 and 1930, the Ndyuka managed to gain a near monopoly on the freight trade between Albina, Suriname and Saint-Laurent-du-Maroni, French Guiana in the north, and the Surinamese and French Guianese interiors in the south. In 1921, the Maroon Freighter Strike was called and lasted three months. The strike had serious economic consequences, and severely disrupted the Balatá and gold industry in both countries. Governor van Heemstra even threatened to end the autonomy of the Ndyuka over the strike.

Development and health care
In 1919, a pilot project to improve agriculture, education and medical care failed, because the necessary funds were never supplied. The Ndyuka were later blamed because they resisted the imposition of taxation. On 6 May 1924,  postulated in the Colonial States: "Economically, the Bushnegroes thus far have had little significance for the Colony, and that is not their fault, but the Dutch Government's [fault], which has neglected these people, and tolerated that today, in the 20th century, we are still talking about Bushnegroes."

Generally, medical care was provided free for Maroons who journeyed to the coastal area. An attempt in 1913 to charge for medical care in the hospitals was ignored in practice, and later revoked by Governor Johannes Kielstra, because it was better for the overall sanitary conditions. In a 1943 meeting between the Governor and the s the population decline in the tribal areas was discussed. The s talked about alarming rates of tuberculosis, malaria, and infertility. The proposed solution was to send a medical team into the tribal areas, and make people aware about the dangers of inbreeding. In 1946, Medische Zending was put in charge of the health care in tribal areas. The improved medical care resulted in a rapid population growth.

Interior War

In the late 1980s, the Surinamese Interior War was fought between the Suriname National Army and a rebel group known as the Jungle Commando, led by Ronnie Brunswijk. The civil war resulted in a refugee crisis into French Guiana especially from the Marowijne District. Even though Brunswijk was a Ndyuka, Gaanman Gazon, the paramount chief, refused to take sides in the conflict, and maintained strict neutrality in the Tapanahony resort. On 26 May 1987, Gazon published a plea to the international community for mediation.

Current situation

In the last decades of the 20th century a large number of the Ndyuka people began moving from their ancestral villages to the coast, especially in and around Paramaribo, the country's capital. Their motivations for moving were mainly economic. As of 2014, of the estimated 90,000 Ndyukas, only 26,000 live in the tribal lands, while 30,000 live in and around Paramaribo, 21,000 in French Guiana and 7,500 in the Netherlands.

In Utrecht, André R.M. Pakosie was installed as captain for the Netherlands.

On 13 June 2020, Ronnie Brunswijk was elected Vice President of Suriname by acclamation in an uncontested election. He was inaugurated on 16 July as the first Maroon in Suriname to serve as vice president.

Governance
The Treaty of 1760 allowed the Ndyuka privileges, but also imposed restrictions like the return of runaway slaves, and in case of an external war, they must provide an army to fight with the Suriname National Army.

Originally the tribe was free to settle anywhere with permission providing it was at a distance of at least ten hours from the plantations. That definition was rather vague, and in 1837, it was changed to a delimited area around the Cottica River in Marowijne District, and the Tapanahony River.

The  acts as the local government. In case of important decisions, the whole village participates and a decision is taken on the basis of consensus.

The resorts in the Marowijne District are governed by a Resort Council, democratically elected at the General Election. The decentralization commission was aware of the problem in 2007, but as of 2020, the two systems existed side by side.

For Tapanahony, a district commissioner is appointed to represent the Surinamese government.

In the draft agreement, there was a provision for an independent judicial system except for the crimes which could carry a death sentence. The article caused much debate, and was dropped altogether in the final agreement. In practice an independent judicial system was in operation except for people accused of major crimes who were turned over to the Suriname government. In the second half of the 20th century, the system became obsolete for criminal cases.

Even though the Treaty has significant implications for Suriname, it was not mentioned in the Government Regulations of 1865 nor in the Constitution of 1936. In 1975, in preparation of the Independence of Suriname, the treaties with the Maroons were subject to much debate in both the Dutch and Surinamese parliaments, however the Maroon autonomy has not been mentioned once in both the Constitution of Suriname or the Declaration of Independence. The Treaty deals with the rights and obligations of the tribe, however the Constitution does not mention the tribe or its government, therefore if the  says no, the issue can be pushed through, because the legal position of the  has not been defined.

Nevertheless, the treaties are still in effect. In 2005, the Inter-American Court of Human Rights ruled on the 1986 Moiwana massacre. The court upheld the 1760 Treaty, and determined that "the Moiwana community members may be considered the legitimate owners of their traditional lands."

Lifestyle

The Milwaukee Public Museum says the following about the Ndyuka and their way of Maroon life:

Religion
The traditional religion of the Ndyuka was Winti, a synthesis of African religion traditions. The Marowijne District was accessible to outsiders, and the Catholic and Moravian Church founded churches and schools first in neighbouring Albina and later in the Maroon villages. The extensive traditional funerary rites are generally practised, and Winti is a major religion, however the majority are Christians.

Notable people
 Florian Jozefzoon
Lénaïck Adam (1992), French politician
Ronnie Brunswijk (1961), Vice President of Suriname and ex-rebel leader
Gaanman Gazon (1920–2011), former granman
André Pakosie (1955), writer and activist

References

Bibliography

External links
 

 
Surinamese Maroons